sK1 is an open-source, cross-platform illustration program that seeks to be a substitute for professional proprietary software like CorelDRAW or Adobe Illustrator. Unique project features are CorelDRAW formats importers, tabbed multiple document interface, Cairo-based engine, and color management.

History 

A small team led by Igor Novikov started the project in 2003, based on the existing open source vector graphics editor Skencil. sK1 is a fork of the Skencil 0.6.x series which used Tk widgets for the user interface (this version had been dropped by the main Skencil developers who were working on a branch of the program based on GTK+). 

In 2007 the sK1 team reverse-engineered the CorelDRAW (CDR) format. The results and the first working snapshot of the CDR importer were presented at the Libre Graphics Meeting 2007 conference taking place in May 2007 in Montreal (Canada). Later on the team parsed the structure of other Corel formats with the help of CDR Explorer. Export into CDR and CMX file formats was presented at the Libre Graphics Meeting 2019 conference taking place in May 2019 in Saarbrücken (Germany).

Target audience 

Since the project was started by a small team of Ukrainian professionals in prepress, it was unambiguously focused on full support for PostScript, PDF, CMYK color model and color management at the expense of developing some advanced functions for illustrators. Informally the project is positioned as a free open source alternative to the commercial CorelDRAW.

Functionality 
Compared to Inkscape, sK1 has a limited feature set, adequate for simple sketching, while its user interface remains clean. Drawable objects include circles and ellipses, rectangles, text, Bezier curves, and straight lines. Those can be transformed in typical manners and aligned in multiple ways.

Supported formats 
 Import
 CorelDRAW v7-X4 (CDR/CDT/CCX/CDRX/CMX)
 Adobe Illustrator up to version 9 (based on PostScript)
 Postscript (PS) and Encapsulated Postscript (EPS)
 Computer Graphics Metafile (CGM)
 Windows Metafile (WMF)
 XFIG
 Scalable Vector Graphics (SVG)
 Skencil/Sketch/sK1 (SK, SK1, SK2)
 Acorn Draw (AFF)
 PLT - HPGL cutting plotter files
 CorelDRAW palettes (CPL and XML)
 Adobe Swatch Exchange palettes (ASE)
 Adobe Photoshop palettes (ACO)
 Xara Designer palettes (JCW)
 GIMP/Inkscape palettes (GPL)
 LibreOffice palettes (SOC)
 Scribus palettes (XML)
 sK1 palettes (SKP)
 Adobe Photoshop files (PSD)
 GIMP files (XCF)
 Images BMP, PNG, JPG, JPEG2000, TIFF, GIF, PCX, PPM, WEBP, XBM, XPM

 Export
 AI - Adobe Illustrator 5.0 (based on PostScript)
 PDF - Portable Document Format
 PS - PostScript
 SVG - Scalable Vector Graphics
 SK/SK1/SK2 - Skencil/Sketch/sK1
 CGM - Computer Graphics Metafile
 WMF - Windows Metafile
 PLT - HPGL cutting plotter files
 CorelDRAW palettes (CPL and XML)
 Adobe Swatch Exchange palettes (ASE)
 Adobe Photoshop palettes (ACO)
 Xara Designer palettes (JCW)
 GIMP/Inkscape palettes (GPL)
 LibreOffice palettes (SOC)
 Scribus palettes (XML)
 sK1 palettes (SKP)
 PNG - Portable Network Graphics

Side projects
UniConvertor
 an application for conversion of files from one vector format into another one. In fact it is a part of sK1, rewritten as a standalone code and being developed by the same team. UniConvertor is also used by Inkscape for opening CorelDRAW, WMF and Sketch/Skencil files. 
Color Palette Collection
 a set of free palettes provided in different native file formats for sK1, Inkscape, GIMP, Scribus, LibreOffice, CorelDRAW, Adobe Illustrator, Xara Designer etc. For sK1 2.0 the palette collection is available as a web service.
CDR Explorer
 a program that simplifies the reverse-engineering of CorelDRAW formats.
 LinCutter
 an application for interactive work with cutting machines (PLT format).

Awards 

 In 2007 the project was awarded the second place in the Trophées du Libre open source project contest in the "Multimedia and games" category.
 In 2008 the project was awarded the third place in the contest Hackontest, organized by the Swiss Open Systems User Groupd /ch/open and sponsored by Google.
 In 2009 the project was awarded the second place in the contest "The best free project of Russia", conducted by Linux Format magazine. Among the group projects.
 In 2009 the UniConvertor project was awarded the first place in the Trophées du Libre open source project contest in the "Multimedia" category.

sK1 versions

UniConvertor versions

See also

 Comparison of vector graphics editors

References

External links
 

Free vector graphics editors
Free diagramming software
Free software programmed in C
Free software programmed in Python
Software forks
Vector graphics editors for Linux
Vector graphics editors
Software that uses wxWidgets